Haijian 49 is a China Marine Surveillance (CMS) ship in the 4th Marine Surveillance Flotilla of the East China Sea Fleet. On September 11, 2012, after Japanese Prime Minister Yoshihiko Noda decided to "purchase" Diaoyu Islands from its "private owner", Haijian 46 and Haijian 49 set out to conduct cruise operations in waters around the disputed Diaoyu Islands.

References

Ships of the China Marine Surveillance